Eric Eisner may refer to one of the following:
Eric Eisner (producer), an American entrepreneur
Eric Eisner (lawyer), an American lawyer